Wheeler School is a private school located on the East Side of Providence, Rhode Island, United States. The school serves students from the preschool level through twelfth-grade.

History

Early history 
In 1889, an art school for girls was established by an aspiring artist named Mary C. Wheeler. In 1900, adding an academic college preparatory curriculum to her art instruction, Mary Wheeler accepted ten female students as boarders and officially founded The Mary C. Wheeler School. A building on Brook Street was purchased, in 1898, to house girls enrolled in the preparatory program for her Cabot Street School.

In 1910, Hope Building was constructed to provide living and dining facilities required by a growing student body and faculty. In 1912, the original Fresh Air Building was completed, though it was later rebuilt. The Mary C. Wheeler School thus became one of the first American schools to use the principles of Maria Montessori in its kindergarten instruction. Wheeler also purchased the Froebel Kindergarten School which admitted boys into its pre-primary grades until the 1950s.

The daughter of a farmer, Wheeler acquired a  farm and house in Seekonk, Massachusetts in 1912–13. At one point, she advertised her school in Vogue as the Mary C. Wheeler Town & Country School.

Mary Helena Dey was hired in 1914 to reorder the school’s curriculum. As a result, the school became a pioneer in the educational theories of John Dewey. Through Dey’s contacts, such notables as Carl Sandburg came to campus to meet with students or, in Sandburg’s case, deliver the graduation address.

The first Wheeler Field Day was celebrated in 1915, and is the oldest continuously-celebrated tradition at the school.

Middle years: 1920-1980 
Wheeler died in 1920 at the age of 73. In her will she established a board of trustees to oversee the school. Mary Helena Dey, who had studied under educational theorist John Dewey at the University of Chicago, was named headmistress. In the mid-20s, the farm facilities were expanded at a cost of $4,400 to include a field hockey field and two tennis courts. The “swimming hole” was enlarged and deepened. Later an arboretum, featuring several hundred unusual plants and trees, was established at the farm in Dey's name, but has been lost to time.

In 1940, Mabel Van Norman was appointed the third headmistress on the retirement of Dey, Van Norman continued the school through the years of World War II and spent time visiting war-torn schools in the Netherlands and Belgium which Wheeler students helped to support with food and supplies. In 1950, she was succeeded by S. Rowland “Rowly” Morgan, Jr.

Morgan became the first male to lead the school and a residence was purchased, at 211 Hope Street, to provide a home outside of the girls' dormitory for his family. In 1952, the Wheeler Annual Fund was established to support the school through donations by alumni, family and friends.

In 1968, Hugh A. Madden was named headmaster. Coeducation was approved for the lower grades in 1973, and expanded to include the entire school in 1975. The name of the school officially changed to The Wheeler School. The boarding program was phased out in 1979.

Modern-era 

William C. Prescott, Jr. succeeded Hugh Madden as headmaster in 1980.

The Hamilton School at Wheeler opened in 1988 to its first group of 35 students in grades 1-6. In 1990, a new library was constructed. The building  was designed by Schwartz/Silver Architects of Boston. A large division of the library is named in memory of third headmistress Mabel Van Norman.

Wheeler was the Providence site of the Summerbridge National program in 1992.

WELH-FM (Wheeler's radio station at FM 88.1) went on the air in 1994 at the end of a 10-year process begun as an Aerie student project. As of 2006, the station broadcasts Spanish-language programming in the morning and a golden oldies format in the afternoon, and the station streams via the internet. Students also use the facilities to record news programs and interviews. Since October 8, 2011, WELH has broadcast programming from Rhode Island Public Radio.

As of October 2014 the school has nearly 800 students with 200 faculty and staff. In addition to its main campus in Providence, the school has a  farm facility for athletics, the Sixth Grade Farm Program, summer camp, ropes course, sports programs and environmental research.

In 2014 the school dedicated a new 18,000 square foot performing arts center featuring a stepped seating auditorium, five new performing arts classrooms, studios, and storage spaces.

Notable alumni 

 Scott Carney (b. 1978) -  American investigative journalist 
 Trudy Coxe (b. 1949) - CEO of the Preservation Society of Newport County and former Environmental Secretary of Massachusetts.
 Nico Muhly (b. 1981) - contemporary classical music composer.
 Zoë Chao (b. 1985) - actress, notably in Strangers, Love Life, and Modern Love.
 Josh Schwartz (b. 1976) - writer/producer of the television series The O.C., Chuck, Gossip Girl, and Hart of Dixie
 Gloria Vanderbilt (1924-2019) - American artist, author, actress, fashion designer, heiress, and socialite.

Notes

Private high schools in Rhode Island
Private elementary schools in Rhode Island
Private middle schools in Rhode Island
Educational institutions established in 1889
High schools in Providence, Rhode Island
1889 establishments in Rhode Island